is a Japanese football player currently playing for Renofa Yamaguchi FC.

Career statistics
Updated to 4 December 2020.

References

External links
Profile at Vissel Kobe

1987 births
Living people
Senshu University alumni
Association football people from Yamagata Prefecture
Japanese footballers
J1 League players
J2 League players
Kashiwa Reysol players
Tochigi SC players
Vegalta Sendai players
Vissel Kobe players
Renofa Yamaguchi FC players
Association football defenders